The Ford Taurus is a full-size car produced by Ford in China through the Changan Ford joint venture for the Chinese and Middle Eastern markets. Sharing only its nameplate with its 1986-2019 American namesake, the Taurus was developed in conjunction with Ford Australia.

Model overview 

Produced by Changan Ford in its Hangzhou facility, exports of the Chinese Ford Taurus model line did not begin until 2020, when GCC (Middle East) exports commenced, replacing the American-produced Taurus.

The Changan Ford Taurus is derived from the Ford CD4 platform while adding 3.9 inches to the wheelbase of the Ford Fusion/Ford Mondeo. The Changan Ford Taurus also shares its platform architecture with the Lincoln Continental, making the Taurus the flagship Ford sedan for Chinese markets. While sharing similar front and rear fascia designs with the Mondeo, the Taurus was styled with a formal rear roofline.      

During 2016, a 1.5L inline-4 engine was added. A 6-speed automatic is the sole transmission offering.

2019 facelift 

References

External links

 

7th generation
Sedans
Cars of China
Cars introduced in 2016
2010s cars
Executive cars
Ford CD4 platform
Front-wheel-drive vehicles
Full-size vehicles
Police vehicles
Flagship vehicles